The Six Years' War (1868–74) was a civil war in the Dominican Republic that "constituted the third war of independence fought by the Dominican people", in this case against the administration of President Buenaventura Báez, which in 1869 negotiated the Dominican Republic's annexation to the United States. According to the Dominican intellectual Pedro Henríquez Ureña, this war was a critical phase in the creation of Dominican national consciousness because, having already differentiated themselves from the Haitians in the first war of independence and the Spaniards in the second, the Dominicans asserted their incompatibility with the United States.

The war was fought mainly by irregulars (revolutionaries, intellectuals, conservative elements in the military) against the regular Dominican Army loyal to Báez.

According to Hector Avalos, the civil war had a religious dimension, since the predominantly Catholic Dominicans, having already rejected Haitian Vodou, now decisively rejected American Protestantism.

Dominican annexation was successful in the 1870 referendum, but was defeated in the United States Senate.

References

History of the Dominican Republic
Second Dominican Republic
Wars involving the Dominican Republic
19th-century revolutions
19th century in the Caribbean
19th century in the Dominican Republic
Conflicts in 1868
Conflicts in 1874 
 Military history of the Caribbean